HMS Opossum was a "twenty-seven knotter" torpedo boat destroyer of the British Royal Navy. Built by the Tyneside shipbuilder Hawthorn Leslie, Opossum was one of three destroyers built by Hawthorns that were ordered in 1894. She was launched in 1895 and completed in 1896. She remained in service during the First World War, where she was used for local patrol duties based at Plymouth and sank the German submarine  on 8 August 1918. She was sold for scrap in 1920.

Design and construction
The Admiralty laid down broad requirements for the destroyers, including speed, the use of an arched turtleback forecastle and armament, with the detailed design left to the builders, resulting in each of the builders producing different designs.

Displacement was  light and  full load. Armament consisted of a single QF 12 pounder 12 cwt gun and three 6-pounder guns, with two 18 inch (450 mm) torpedo tubes. One of the torpedo tubes could be removed to accommodate a further two six-pounders. The ship's crew was 53 officers and men.

On 17 September 1895 Opossum was laid down as Yard Number 326 at Hawthorn Leslie's Hebburn, Tyneside shipyard, and was launched on 9 August 1895. The ship reached a speed of  during sea trials, and was completed in February 1896.

Service
On 26 June 1897, Opossum took part in the naval review at Spithead to celebrate the Golden Jubilee of Queen Victoria. Opossum, based at Devonport, took part in the 1901 Royal Navy Naval Manoeuvres in July–August that year.  In 1905, Opossum was one of a number of old destroyers which the Rear Admiral (Destroyers) condemned as being "..all worn out", with "every shilling spent on these old 27-knotters is a waste of money". In November 1907, Opossum was paid off for refitting at Chatham Dockyard, where her boilers were retubed, this refit continuing until June 1908.

On 30 August 1912 the Admiralty directed all destroyers were to be grouped into classes designated by letters based on contract speed and appearance.

By February 1913, Opossum was not part of an active flotilla, but was attached as a tender to the shore establishment  at Devonport, with a nucleus crew and was still attached to Vivid in July 1914, on the eve of the outbreak of the First World War.

By January 1915, Opossum was allocated to the Devonport Local Defence Flotilla. On 1 April 1917, Opossum took part in the salvage of the merchant ship SS Valacia, and her crew was later awarded salvage money. The submarine had already left the area, however.

On 8 August 1918, the German submarine  was laying a minefield off Start Point, Devon, when the submarine fouled one of her own mines. The resulting explosion was spotted by Opossum, which was on a routine anti-submarine patrol nearby. Opossum and several Motor Launches started a search for the submarine using Hydrophones and sweeps. UC-49 was assumed to by lying on the sea bed, and when the submarine restarted motors at 15:20 hr, the noise attracted several depth charges, and more depth charges were dropped at 17:57 hr. After 20 seconds, the submarine descended under the surface again, with her bows at an angle of 50 degrees, and several more depth charges were dropped, bringing up oil and bubbles. The next day, the wreck, which had been located by sweeps, was plastered with depth charges in order to break it up to confirm that the submarine had been sunk. When debris including a light bulb manufactured in Vienna came to the surface, it was confirmed that the submarine had been destroyed.

Opossum remained part of the Devonport Local Defence Flotilla at the end of the war in November 1918. By March 1919, Opossum was laid up in reserve at Devonport, She was sold on 29 July 1920 to Ward for breaking up at their Preston yard.

Pennant numbers

References

Notes

Citations

Bibliography

External links
 H.M.S. Opossum. The Dreadnought Project.
 Rickard, J. HMS Opossum. HistoryOfWar.org. 28 December 2018.

Ships built on the River Tyne
1895 ships
A-class destroyers (1913)
Sunfish-class destroyers